The Central District of Kerman County is a district (bakhsh) in Kerman County, Kerman Province, Iran. At the 2006 census, its population was 557,236, in 142,815 families.  The district has four cities: Kerman, Baghin, Ekhtiarabad, and Zangiabad. The district has five rural districts (dehestan): Baghin Rural District, Derakhtengan Rural District, Ekhtiarabad Rural District, Sar Asiab-e Farsangi Rural District, and Zangiabad Rural District.

References 

Kerman County
Districts of Kerman Province